The monochlorophenols are chemical compounds consisting of phenol substituted with a chlorine atom.  There are three isomers, 2-chlorophenol, 3-chlorophenol, and 4-chlorophenol.

See also
 Chlorophenol
 Monobromophenol

References

Chloroarenes
Phenols